Prince Augustus Ferdinand of Prussia (23 May 1730 – 2 May 1813) was a Prussian prince and general, as well as Herrenmeister ("Master of the Knights") of the Bailiwick of Brandenburg of the Order of Saint John. He belonged to the House of Hohenzollern, and was the youngest son of Frederick William I of Prussia by his wife, Queen Sophia Dorothea.

Family

He was the youngest child of King Frederick William I of Prussia and his wife Sophia Dorothea of Hanover. He was also a younger brother of King Frederick the Great (Frederick II of Prussia), Queen Louisa Ulrika of Sweden, and Wilhelmine Margravine of Brandenburg-Bayreuth.

Already at the age of 5, he joined the Infantry regiment „Kronprinz“. In 1740, his brother named him commander of Infantry regiment Nr 34. In 1756, he became Major General and accompanied his brother the King on his campaigns in Saxony, Bohemia, and Silesia. He fought in the Battle of Breslau and the Battle of Leuthen. But in 1758, bad health forced him to leave the army. In 1762, he purchased Friedrichsfelde Palace near Berlin. Ferdinand is also remembered for having the Schloss Bellevue in the Berliner Tiergarten built in 1786, today seat of the Presidents of Germany.

On September 12, 1763, Ferdinand was elected as Master of the Knights of the Bailiwick of Brandenburg of the Order of Saint John, a post he held until 1812.

Marriage and children 
He married his niece, Margravine Elisabeth Louise of Brandenburg-Schwedt, on 27 September 1755. She was a daughter of his older sister Sophia Dorothea and her husband Margrave Frederick William of Brandenburg-Schwedt. Despite this family tie, she was only eight years younger than him, due to the significant age difference between him and his sister.

They had seven children:

 Princess Friederike Elisabeth Dorothea Henriette Amalie (1761–1773)
 Prince Friedrich Heinrich  Emil Karl (1769–1773)
 Princess Friederike Louise (1770–1836), married to Prince Antoni Radziwiłł. Had issue.
 Prince Friedrich Christian Heinrich Ludwig (1771–1790)
 Prince Louis Ferdinand (1772–1806), killed in the Battle of Saalfeld. No legitimate issue.
 Prince Friedrich Paul Heinrich August (1776)
 Prince Augustus (1779–1843), morganatic marriage (1832-1843) to Polish aristocrat Emilie von Ostrowska.

Augustus died in Berlin on 2 May 1813, as the last surviving grandchild of George I of Great Britain. Elisabeth Louise would die seven years later, on 10 February 1820.

Ancestry

References

Sources
 
 

1730 births
1813 deaths
Military personnel from Berlin
Prussian princes
House of Hohenzollern
Prussian military personnel of the Seven Years' War
Grand Croix of the Légion d'honneur
Burials at Berlin Cathedral
Sons of kings